The 2008–09 New Orleans Hornets season was the 7th season of the franchise in the National Basketball Association.

The regular season was marred by injuries, with only Rasual Butler playing in all games. The remaining four starters missed a combined 68 games, of whom center Tyson Chandler missed 37 games. Even when not on the injured list, Chandler's season was sub-par. Perhaps partly as a result of this, on February 18 Chandler was traded to the Oklahoma City Thunder for forwards Joe Smith and Chris Wilcox. Despite the less than stellar season, this was generally perceived as a payroll-shedding move. However, within a day, the trade was rescinded due to concerns regarding Chandlers turf toe, which curiously, according to Chandler and the Hornet organization was not the reason for his stints on the injury list.

Battling these issues for much of the season, the Hornets finished the season with a record of 49–33, 7 games off the franchise best record of the previous season. This meant that the Hornets only finished 4th in the Southwest Division and 7th in the Western Conference. In the 2009 NBA Playoffs, the Hornets lost 1–4 in the first round to the second seeded Denver Nuggets. All four losses were severe, with the worst being a 58–point drubbing at home in Game 4, losing 63–121, which tied for the most lopsided loss in NBA Playoff history. Naturally lamented by fans and media alike, the embarrassing performance can at least be partly explained by the health situation of the players, with arguably the top 5 Hornets ailing to varying injuries.

Key dates
June 26: The 2008 NBA draft will take place in New York City.
July 1: The free agency period will start.

Offseason
On July 9 the Hornets announced they had signed their All Star point guard Chris Paul to a contract extension. Hornets owner George Shinn saying ''Chris is the face of our franchise and a leader both on and off the court...Getting him signed to an extension was our number one priority...'' On July 23 it was announced the Hornets had acquired free agent forward James Posey. Posey, a member of the 2008 Boston Celtics team that won the championship said ''I am excited to be a Hornet, it was a coveted destination for me...''

Draft picks

Trades
December 10, 2008: The New Orleans Hornets traded Mike James to the Washington Wizards for Antonio Daniels.

February 17, 2009: The Hornets traded Tyson Chandler to the Oklahoma City Thunder for Joe Smith, Chris Wilcox and rights to DeVon Hardin. The trade was nullified when Chandler failed his physical because of a previous turf toe injury.

All Stars

For the second year in a row the Hornets were represented with two players at the NBA All Star Game as Chris Paul was voted in by the fans as a starter, and David West was selected as a reserve by the NBA coaches.

Roster

Regular season

Standings

Game log

|- bgcolor="#bbffbb"
| 1
| October 29
| @ Golden State
| 
| David West (24)
| Tyson Chandler (16)
| Chris Paul (11)
| Oracle Arena19,128
| 1–0
|- bgcolor="#bbffbb"
| 2
| October 30
| @ Phoenix
| 
| Morris Peterson (21)
| Chris Paul (8)
| Chris Paul (10)
| US Airways Center18,422
| 2–0

|- bgcolor="#bbffbb"
| 3
| November 1
| Cleveland
| 
| David West (25)
| James Posey (6)
| Chris Paul (15)
| New Orleans Arena18,150
| 3–0
|- bgcolor="#ffcccc"
| 4
| November 5
| Atlanta
| 
| Chris Paul (22)
| David West, Tyson Chandler (7)
| Chris Paul (11)
| New Orleans Arena16,030
| 3–1
|- bgcolor="#ffcccc"
| 5
| November 7
| @ Charlotte
| 
| Predrag Stojaković, Chris Paul (20)
| Predrag Stojaković, Tyson Chandler (7)
| Chris Paul (10)
| Time Warner Cable Arena13,435
| 3–2
|- bgcolor="#bbffbb"
| 6
| November 8
| Miami
| 
| David West, Chris Paul (21)
| Tyson Chandler (10)
| Chris Paul (13)
| New Orleans Arena17,701
| 4–2
|- bgcolor="#ffcccc"
| 7
| November 12
| L.A. Lakers
| 
| Chris Paul (30)
| David West (12)
| Chris Paul (13)
| New Orleans Arena18,239
| 4–3
|- bgcolor="#bbffbb"
| 8
| November 14
| Portland
| 
| David West (18)
| Tyson Chandler (7)
| Chris Paul (9)
| New Orleans Arena16,071
| 5–3
|- bgcolor="#ffcccc"
| 9
| November 15
| @ Houston
| 
| David West (18)
| David West (10)
| Chris Paul (12)
| Toyota Center18,303
| 5–4
|- bgcolor="#ffcccc"
| 10
| November 19
| Sacramento
| 
| David West (22)
| Tyson Chandler (10)
| Chris Paul (15)
| New Orleans Arena15,533
| 5–5
|- bgcolor="#bbffbb"
| 11
| November 21
| @ Oklahoma City
| 
| David West (19)
| David West (8)
| Chris Paul (6)
| Ford Center19,136
| 6–5
|- bgcolor="#bbffbb"
| 12
| November 22
| Oklahoma City
| 
| David West (33)
| Chris Paul (10)
| Chris Paul (16)
| New Orleans Arena16,023
| 7–5
|- bgcolor="#bbffbb"
| 13
| November 24
| @ L.A. Clippers
| 
| David West (27)
| Chris Paul (10)
| Chris Paul (17)
| Staples Center14,956
| 8–5
|- bgcolor="#bbffbb"
| 14
| November 27
| @ Denver
| 
| Chris Paul (22)
| David West (8)
| Chris Paul (10)
| Pepsi Center15,563
| 9–5
|- bgcolor="#ffcccc"
| 15
| November 28
| @ Portland
| 
| Predrag Stojaković (21)
| Chris Paul, Tyson Chandler (6)
| Chris Paul (6)
| Rose Garden20,638
| 9–6

|- bgcolor="#bbffbb"
| 16
| December 3
| Phoenix
| 
| Predrag Stojaković, Chris Paul (24)
| David West (14)
| Chris Paul (15)
| New Orleans Arena15,804
| 10–6
|- bgcolor="#bbffbb"
| 17
| December 6
| Memphis
| 
| Chris Paul (21)
| James Posey (7)
| Chris Paul (11)
| New Orleans Arena16,822
| 11–6
|- bgcolor="#bbffbb"
| 18
| December 10
| Charlotte
| 
| David West, Predrag Stojaković (17)
| Tyson Chandler (11)
| Chris Paul (15)
| New Orleans Arena15,750
| 12–6
|- bgcolor="#ffcccc"
| 19
| December 12
| @ Boston
| 
| David West (23)
| David West (14)
| Chris Paul (14)
| TD Banknorth Garden18,624
| 12–7
|- bgcolor="#bbffbb"
| 20
| December 14
| @ Toronto
| 
| David West (29)
| James Posey (10)
| Chris Paul (12)
| Air Canada Centre18,537
| 13–7
|- bgcolor="#bbffbb"
| 21
| December 16
| @ Memphis
| 
| David West, Chris Paul (18)
| Tyson Chandler (6)
| Chris Paul (9)
| FedExForum10,231
| 14–7
|- bgcolor="#bbffbb"
| 22
| December 17
| San Antonio
| 
| David West (21)
| Tyson Chandler (11)
| Chris Paul (12)
| New Orleans Arena16,593
| 15–7
|- bgcolor="#bbffbb"
| 23
| December 20
| Sacramento
| 
| Chris Paul (34)
| Tyson Chandler (8)
| Chris Paul (9)
| New Orleans Arena16,869
| 16–7
|- bgcolor="#ffcccc"
| 24
| December 23
| L.A. Lakers
| 
| Rasual Butler, Chris Paul (17)
| Tyson Chandler (10)
| Chris Paul (10)
| New Orleans Arena18,405
| 16–8
|- bgcolor="#ffcccc"
| 25
| December 25
| @ Orlando
| 
| David West (13)
| David West (7)
| Chris Paul (4)
| Amway Arena17,461
| 16–9
|- bgcolor="#bbffbb"
| 26
| December 26
| Houston
| 
| Chris Paul (26)
| Tyson Chandler (12)
| Chris Paul (10)
| New Orleans Arena18,326
| 17–9
|- bgcolor="#bbffbb"
| 27
| December 28
| @ Indiana
| 
| James Posey, Chris Paul (19)
| David West (10)
| Chris Paul (12)
| Conseco Fieldhouse14,374
| 18–9
|- bgcolor="#bbffbb"
| 28
| December 30
| Washington
| 
| Rasual Butler (21)
| Tyson Chandler (11)
| Chris Paul (16)
| New Orleans Arena18,021
| 19–9

|- bgcolor="#bbffbb"
| 29
| January 2
| @ Portland
| 
| David West (25)
| James Posey (9)
| Chris Paul (11)
| Rose Garden20,708
| 20–9
|- bgcolor="#ffcccc"
| 30
| January 3
| @ Denver
| 
| Chris Paul (30)
| David West (8)
| Chris Paul (11)
| Pepsi Center19,614
| 20–10
|- bgcolor="#bbffbb"
| 31
| January 6
| @ L.A. Lakers
| 
| David West (40)
| David West (11)
| Chris Paul (15)
| Staples Center18,997
| 21–10
|- bgcolor="#ffcccc"
| 32
| January 7
| @ Utah
| 
| Chris Paul (26)
| David West (6)
| Chris Paul (7)
| EnergySolutions Arena19,911
| 21–11
|- bgcolor="#bbffbb"
| 33
| January 9
| L.A. Clippers
| 
| Rasual Butler (27)
| Tyson Chandler (11)
| Chris Paul (7)
| New Orleans Arena17,815
| 22–11
|- bgcolor="#ffcccc"
| 34
| January 12
| New York
| 
| David West (25)
| David West (14)
| Chris Paul (7)
| New Orleans Arena16,177
| 22–12
|- bgcolor="#bbffbb"
| 35
| January 14
| @ Dallas
| 
| Chris Paul (33)
| Tyson Chandler (14)
| Chris Paul (11)
| American Airlines Center19,947
| 23–12
|- bgcolor="#ffcccc"
| 36
| January 16
| @ Cleveland
| 
| David West (23)
| Tyson Chandler (9)
| Chris Paul (6)
| Quicken Loans Arena20,562
| 23–13
|- bgcolor="#bbffbb"
| 37
| January 17
| @ Detroit
| 
| Chris Paul (23)
| Tyson Chandler (11)
| Chris Paul (14)
| The Palace of Auburn Hills22,076
| 24–13
|- bgcolor="#bbffbb"
| 38
| January 19
| Indiana
| 
| Chris Paul (27)
| Melvin Ely (6)
| Chris Paul (9)
| New Orleans Arena17,237
| 25–13
|- bgcolor="#bbffbb"
| 39
| January 21
| New Jersey
| 
| Chris Paul (29)
| Predrag Stojaković (10)
| Chris Paul (8)
| New Orleans Arena14,748
| 26–13
|- bgcolor="#ffcccc"
| 40
| January 23
| @ Minnesota
| 
| James Posey (24)
| Sean Marks (7)
| Chris Paul (12)
| Target Center18,224
| 26–14
|- bgcolor="#bbffbb"
| 41
| January 26
| Philadelphia
| 
| Chris Paul (27)
| Chris Paul (10)
| Chris Paul (15)
| New Orleans Arena16,131
| 27–14
|- bgcolor="#bbffbb"
| 42
| January 28
| Denver
| 
| Predrag Stojaković (26)
| James Posey (9)
| Chris Paul (10)
| New Orleans Arena15,792
| 28–14
|- bgcolor="#ffcccc"
| 43
| January 30
| Golden State
| 
| Chris Paul (31)
| David West (15)
| Chris Paul (8)
| New Orleans Arena17,738
| 28–15
|- bgcolor="#ffcccc"
| 44
| January 31
| @ San Antonio
| 
| Chris Paul (38)
| David West (10)
| Chris Paul (4)
| AT&T Center18,797
| 28–16

|- bgcolor="#ffcccc"
| 45
| February 2
| Portland
| 
| David West (25)
| David West (8)
| Chris Paul (13)
| New Orleans Arena14,781
| 28–17
|- bgcolor="#ffcccc"
| 46
| February 4
| Chicago
| 
| Predrag Stojaković, David West (24)
| David West (14)
| Devin Brown (7)
| New Orleans Arena16,270
| 28–18
|- bgcolor="#bbffbb"
| 47
| February 6
| Toronto
| 
| Predrag Stojaković (28)
| David West (10)
| David West, Antonio Daniels (6)
| New Orleans Arena17,319
| 29–18
|- bgcolor="#bbffbb"
| 48
| February 8
| Minnesota
| 
| Rasual Butler (23)
| Rasual Butler (8)
| Antonio Daniels (7)
| New Orleans Arena16,046
| 30–18
|- bgcolor="#ffcccc"
| 49
| February 9
| @ Memphis
| 
| Predrag Stojaković (23)
| Devin Brown (9)
| Antonio Daniels (4)
| FedExForum10,896
| 30–19
|- bgcolor="#ffcccc"
| 50
| February 11
| Boston
| 
| David West (15)
| David West (8)
| Antonio Daniels, Chris Paul (5)
| New Orleans Arena18,080
| 30–20
|- bgcolor="#bbffbb"
| 51
| February 17
| @ Oklahoma City
| 
| David West (37)
| David West (13)
| Chris Paul (8)
| Ford Center18,593
| 31–20
|- bgcolor="#bbffbb"
| 52
| February 18
| Orlando
| 
| Chris Paul (36)
| Melvin Ely, Rasual Butler (8)
| Chris Paul (10)
| New Orleans Arena16,651
| 32–20
|- bgcolor="#ffcccc"
| 53
| February 20
| @ L.A. Lakers
| 
| Rasual Butler (31)
| David West (16)
| Chris Paul (16)
| Staples Center18,997
| 32–21
|- bgcolor="#ffcccc"
| 54
| February 21
| @ Utah
| 
| Chris Paul (24)
| Predrag Stojaković (11)
| Chris Paul (7)
| EnergySolutions Arena19,911
| 32–22
|- bgcolor="#bbffbb"
| 55
| February 23
| @ Sacramento
| 
| Chris Paul (27)
| Tyson Chandler (10)
| Chris Paul (13)
| ARCO Arena11,633
| 33–22
|- bgcolor="#bbffbb"
| 56
| February 25
| Detroit
| 
| David West (30)
| Tyson Chandler (17)
| Chris Paul (13)
| New Orleans Arena17,215
| 34–22
|- bgcolor="#bbffbb"
| 57
| February 27
| Milwaukee
| 
| David West (28)
| David West (12)
| Chris Paul (20)
| New Orleans Arena17,621
| 35–22

|- bgcolor="#bbffbb"
| 58
| March 1
| @ New Jersey
| 
| David West (32)
| Tyson Chandler (12)
| Chris Paul (9)
| Izod Center15,509
| 36–22
|- bgcolor="#bbffbb"
| 59
| March 2
| @ Philadelphia
| 
| David West (30)
| James Posey (12)
| Chris Paul (12)
| Wachovia Center14,299
| 37–22
|- bgcolor="#bbffbb"
| 60
| March 5
| Dallas
| 
| Chris Paul (27)
| Tyson Chandler (11)
| Chris Paul (15)
| New Orleans Arena17,230
| 38–22
|- bgcolor="#bbffbb"
| 61
| March 7
| Oklahoma City
| 
| Chris Paul (21)
| David West (12)
| Chris Paul (14)
| New Orleans Arena18,114
| 39–22
|- bgcolor="#ffcccc"
| 62
| March 9
| @ Atlanta
| 
| Chris Paul (24)
| David West (20)
| Chris Paul (10)
| Philips Arena14,204
| 39–23
|- bgcolor="#bbffbb"
| 63
| March 11
| @ Washington
| 
| Chris Paul (30)
| Chris Paul, Tyson Chandler (10)
| Chris Paul (13)
| Verizon Center15,255
| 40–23
|- bgcolor="#bbffbb"
| 64
| March 13
| @ Milwaukee
| 
| Chris Paul (30)
| Tyson Chandler (17)
| Chris Paul (9)
| Bradley Center15,701
| 41–23
|- bgcolor="#ffcccc"
| 65
| March 14
| @ Chicago
| 
| Chris Paul (29)
| Tyson Chandler (9)
| Chris Paul (6)
| United Center22,135
| 41–24
|- bgcolor="#ffcccc"
| 66
| March 16
| Houston
| 
| Chris Paul (29)
| David West (13)
| Chris Paul (11)
| New Orleans Arena17,723
| 41–25
|- bgcolor="#bbffbb"
| 67
| March 18
| Minnesota
| 
| Chris Paul (26)
| David West, Hilton Armstrong (8)
| Chris Paul (10)
| New Orleans Arena17,253
| 42–25
|- bgcolor="#bbffbb"
| 68
| March 20
| Memphis
| 
| Chris Paul (32)
| James Posey (8)
| Chris Paul (9)
| New Orleans Arena17,837
| 43–25
|- bgcolor="#bbffbb"
| 69
| March 22
| Golden State
| 
| Chris Paul (27)
| Hilton Armstrong (11)
| Chris Paul (8)
| New Orleans Arena16,351
| 44–25
|- bgcolor="#ffcccc"
| 70
| March 25
| Denver
| 
| Chris Paul (19)
| David West (8)
| Chris Paul (13)
| New Orleans Arena17,274
| 44–26
|- bgcolor="#ffcccc"
| 71
| March 27
| @ New York
| 
| David West (29)
| Julian Wright (14)
| Chris Paul (10)
| Madison Square Garden19,763
| 44–27
|- bgcolor="#bbffbb"
| 72
| March 29
| San Antonio
| 
| Chris Paul (26)
| David West (16)
| Chris Paul (9)
| New Orleans Arena18,204
| 45–27
|- bgcolor="#bbffbb"
| 73
| March 31
| @ Sacramento
| 
| David West (40)
| David West (9)
| Chris Paul (15)
| ARCO Arena17,317
| 46–27

|- bgcolor="#bbffbb"
| 74
| April 1
| @ L.A. Clippers
| 
| Chris Paul (30)
| Julian Wright (9)
| Chris Paul (14)
| Staples Center19,060
| 47–27
|- bgcolor="#ffcccc"
| 75
| April 3
| @ Golden State
| 
| Chris Paul (43)
| David West (14)
| Chris Paul (9)
| Oracle Arena19,596
| 47–28
|- bgcolor="#ffcccc"
| 76
| April 5
| Utah
| 
| David West (23)
| David West (12)
| Chris Paul (12)
| New Orleans Arena17,362
| 47–29
|- bgcolor="#bbffbb"
| 77
| April 7
| @ Miami
| 
| Chris Paul (26)
| Chris Paul (9)
| Chris Paul (9)
| American Airlines Arena19,600
| 48–29
|- bgcolor="#ffcccc"
| 78
| April 8
| Phoenix
| 
| Chris Paul (29)
| David West (12)
| Chris Paul (16)
| New Orleans Arena17,781
| 48–30
|- bgcolor="#ffcccc"
| 79
| April 10
| @ Dallas
| 
| Chris Paul (42)
| David West (14)
| Chris Paul (7)
| American Airlines Center20,370
| 48–31
|- bgcolor="#bbffbb"
| 80
| April 12
| Dallas
| 
| David West, Chris Paul (31)
| Chris Paul (9)
| Chris Paul (17)
| New Orleans Arena16,640
| 49–31
|- bgcolor="#ffcccc"
| 81
| April 13
| @ Houston
| 
| David West (14)
| David West (10)
| Chris Paul (7)
| Toyota Center18,409
| 49–32
|- bgcolor="#ffcccc"
| 82
| April 15
| @ San Antonio
| 
| David West (34)
| Paul, West (7)
| Chris Paul (14)
| AT&T Center18,797
| 49–33

Playoffs

|- align="center" bgcolor="#ffcccc"
| 1
| April 19
| @ Denver
| L 84–113
| Chris Paul (21)
| David West (6)
| Chris Paul (11)
| Pepsi Center19,536
| 0–1
|- align="center" bgcolor="#ffcccc"
| 2
| April 22
| @ Denver
| L 93–108
| David West (21)
| Tyson Chandler (11)
| Chris Paul (13)
| Pepsi Center19,623
| 0–2
|- align="center" bgcolor="#ccffcc"
| 3
| April 25
| Denver
| W 95–93
| Chris Paul (32)
| West, Posey (9)
| Chris Paul (12)
| New Orleans Arena17,489
| 1–2
|- align="center" bgcolor="#ffcccc"
| 4
| April 27
| Denver
| L 63–121
| David West (14)
| James Posey (7)
| Chris Paul (6)
| New Orleans Arena17,236
| 1–3
|- align="center" bgcolor="#ffcccc"
| 5
| April 29
| @ Denver
| L 86–107
| David West (24)
| David West (9)
| Chris Paul (10)
| Pepsi Center19,744
| 1–4
|-

Player statistics

Season

Playoffs

Awards and records

Awards
Chris Paul, All-NBA Second Team

Records

Transactions

Trades

Free agents

Additions

Subtractions

See also
2008–09 NBA season

References

New Orleans Hornets seasons
2008–09 NBA season by team